David Shiverick Smith (January 25, 1918 – April 13, 2012) was the United States ambassador to Sweden from 1976–1977.

Smith was born in Omaha, Nebraska, the son of Anna (née Shiverick) and Floyd Monroe Smith. He was appointed by President Dwight D. Eisenhower as a trustee of the National Cultural Center. Smith was a board member of the Council of American Ambassadors. He graduated magna cum laude from Dartmouth College (where he was a member of Phi Beta Kappa), the Sorbonne, and Columbia University Law School.

His niece was actress Anne Ramsey.

References

External links
 David S. Smith on politicalgraveyard.com
 David S. Smith on Council of American Ambassadors
  Google Books

Ambassadors of the United States to Sweden
1918 births
2012 deaths
Dartmouth College alumni
University of Paris alumni
Columbia Law School alumni